Up for the Cup may refer to:

 Up for the Cup (1931 film), a British film directed by Jack Raymond
 Up for the Cup (1950 film), a remake also directed by Jack Raymond